Garyn Smith (born 12 July 1995) is a Welsh rugby union player who plays for the Cornish Pirates at centre. He was a Wales under-20 international.

Smith made his debut for the Cardiff Blues in 2014 having previously played for their academy and Pontypridd RFC.

On 27 May 2022, Garyn Smith signed a one-year contract with Cornish Pirates after being released by Cardiff Blues.

References

External links 
itsrugby.co.uk Profile
Cardiff Blues Player Profile

Rugby union players from Pontypridd
Welsh rugby union players
Cardiff Rugby players
Living people
1995 births
Rugby union centres